"Together" is a song by English singer Ella Eyre. It was released on 17 May 2015 as the third single from her debut studio album Feline. The song was written by Ella McMahon, John Martin, Chris Young and Michel Zitron. The song peaked to number 12 on the UK Singles Chart.

Music video
A music video to accompany the release of "Together" was first released onto YouTube on 14 April 2015 at a total length of three minutes and thirty-nine seconds.

Track listing

Chart performance

Certifications

Release history

References

2014 songs
2015 singles
Ella Eyre songs
Virgin EMI Records singles
Songs written by Ella Eyre
Songs written by John Martin (singer)
Songs written by Michel Zitron